Accession Day is a public holiday in the Union Territory of Jammu and Kashmir, commemorating 26 October 1947, when Maharaja Hari Singh signed off the Instrument of Accession, in which Jammu and Kashmir joined the Dominion of India. It became an official public holiday in Jammu and Kashmir for the first time in 2020.

The festivities of the day include holding rallies, bursting of firecrackers, singing India's national anthem, and raising the flag of India. In some areas, the festivities are as big as those of the Hindu festival of Diwali.

The "Accession Day" is observed as "Black Day" by separatist Kashmiri leaders like Syed Ali Shah Geelani and followers of All Parties Hurriyat Conference in protest of alleged human rights violations by the India's "occupation" of Jammu and Kashmir.

See also

 Republic Day
 Independence Day
 Kashmir conflict
 Jammu and Kashmir Reorganisation Act, 2019

References

Public holidays in India
Annual events in India
October observances
Festivals in Jammu and Kashmir